Zákányszék is a village in Csongrád county, in the Southern Great Plain region of southern Hungary.

It is home to a parrot farm.

Geography

References

Populated places in Csongrád-Csanád County